Don "Swede" Larson (c. 1926 – November 29, 1994) was an American football coach. He was the head football coach at Illinois Wesleyan University in Bloomington, Illinois, for 33 years from 1954 to 1986. He compiled a career record of 166–121–6 and led the team to conference championships in 1964 and 1965, and conference co-championships in 1974, 1977, and 1980. He was selected as the College Conference of Illinois and Wisconsin coach in 1977 and 1980. He also played college football at Illinois Wesleyan and was captain of the 1949 Illinois Wesleyan football team. He also coached the tennis, track, golf, and swimming teams at Illinois Wesleyan.

Head coaching record

Football

References

Year of birth missing
1920s births
1994 deaths
Illinois Wesleyan Titans football coaches
Illinois Wesleyan Titans football players
College golf coaches in the United States
College swimming coaches in the United States
College tennis coaches in the United States
College track and field coaches in the United States
People from Princeton, Illinois
Coaches of American football from Illinois
Players of American football from Illinois
Tennis people from Illinois